The Budgetary treaties of the European Communities were two treaties in the 1970s amending the Treaty of Rome in respects to powers over the Community budget.

The first treaty, signed in 1970, gave the European Parliament the last word on what is known as "non-compulsory expenditure" (compulsory spending is that resulting from EC treaties (including agriculture) and international agreements; the rest is non-compulsory). The second treaty, signed in 1975, gave Parliament the power to reject the budget as a whole and created the European Court of Auditors. However, the Council still has the last word on compulsory spending while Parliament has the last word on non-compulsory spending.

As a result of these treaties, the budgetary authority of what is now the European Union is held jointly by the Council of the European Union and the European Parliament. Parliament is responsible for discharging the implementation of previous budgets, on the basis of the annual report of the European Court of Auditors. It has refused to approve the budget only twice, in 1984 and in 1998. On the latter occasion it led to the resignation of the Santer Commission.

See also
 European Parliament#Budget

References

budgetary
1975 in the European Economic Community
1970 in the European Economic Community